Polymylos is a village and a community of the Kozani municipality. Before the 2011 local government reform it was part of the municipality of Ellispontos, of which it was a municipal district. The 2011 census recorded 408 inhabitants in the village and 436 inhabitants in the community of Polymylos. The community of Polymylos covers an area of 57.371 km2.

Administrative division
The community of Polymylos consists of five separate settlements: 
Agia Paraskevi (uninhabited)
Agioi Theodoroi (population 18)
Leventis (population 3)
Polymylos (population 408)
Zoodochos Pigi (population 3)
The aforementioned population figures are as of 2011.

See also
List of settlements in the Kozani regional unit

References

Populated places in Kozani (regional unit)